Hollyfort is a village north of County Wexford, Ireland. It lies within the townland of Mongan in the valley of the River Bann, 5 km northwest of Gorey.

Like its neighbour Monaseed 4 km to the west, Hollyfort is currently experiencing the addition of housing, in the form of small housing estates. Unlike Monaseed, the Hollyfort developments are generally within the village area. Hollyfort has a pub, Cooney's, as well as a few abandoned buildings, such as the old bakery and petrol station.

See also
 List of towns and villages in Ireland

References

Towns and villages in County Wexford